A Song for Tomorrow is a 1948 second feature drama film directed by Terence Fisher in his directorial debut. It stars Evelyn Maccabe and Ralph Michael. The screenplay concerns a World War II fighter pilot who suffers amnesia.

It was made at Highbury Studios as a second feature.

Premise
A World War II fighter pilot suffers amnesia, and remembers only the voice of an opera singer, with whom he falls in love.

Cast
Evelyn Maccabe as Helen Maxwell
Ralph Michael as Roger Stanton
James Hayter as Nicholas Klaussman
Christopher Lee as Auguste
Conrad Phillips as Lieutenant Fenton
Shaun Noble as Derek Wardell
Ethel Coleridge as Woman in Cinema		
Carleen Lord as Helen's Dresser	
Yvonne Forster as Nurse	
Martin Boddey as Major	
Sam Kydd as Sergeant	
Lockwood West as Mr Stokes

Critical reception
TV Guide wrote, "A touch of amnesia on the audience's part would help them forget this insipid mess."

References

External links

1948 films
Films directed by Terence Fisher
British drama films
1948 drama films
Films set in London
Films shot at Highbury Studios
British black-and-white films
1948 directorial debut films
1940s English-language films
1940s British films